Kurtziella is a genus of small, predatory sea snails, marine gastropod mollusks in the family Mangeliidae. Prior to a 2011 genetic revision, the genus used to be included in the family Conidae.

Species
Species within the genus Kurtziella include:
 Kurtziella acanthodes (Watson, 1881)
 Kurtziella accinctus (Montagu, 1808)
 Kurtziella antiochroa (Pilsbry & Lowe, 1932)
 Kurtziella antipyrgus (Pilsbry & Lowe, 1932)
 Kurtziella atrostyla (Tryon, 1884)
 Kurtziella cerina (Kurtz & Stimpson, 1851)
 Kurtziella corallina (Watson, 1881)
 Kurtziella dorvilliae (Reeve, 1845)
 Kurtziella limonitella (Dall, 1884)
 Kurtziella hebe Dall, W.H., 1919
 Kurtziella margaritifera Fargo, 1953
 Kurtziella newcombei (Dall, 1919)
 Kurtziella perryae Bartsch & Rehder, 1939
 Kurtziella plumbea (Hinds, 1843)
 Kurtziella powelli Shasky, 1971
 Kurtziella rhysa (Watson, 1881)
 Kurtziella serga (Dall, 1881)
 Kurtziella serta (Fargo, 1953)
 Kurtziella tachnodes (Dall, 1927)
 Kurtziella venezuelana Weisbord, 1962
Extinct species
 † Kurtziella limonitella margaritifera  A.A. Olsson & A. Harbison, 1953
 † Kurtziella pagella  W.P. Woodring, 1970
 † Kurtziella prionota  J. Gardner, 1937
 † Kurtziella ramondi  (C.J. Maury, 1910)
 † Kurtziella stenotella  W.P. Woodring, 1970
 † Kurtziella stephanophora  J. Gardner, 1937
 † Kurtziella thektapleura  J. Gardner, 1937
 † Kurtziella websteri  (C.J. Maury, 1910)
Species brought into synonymy
 Kurtziella (Rubellatoma) diomedea (Bartsch & Rehder, 1939) : synonym of Rubellatoma diomedea Bartsch & Rehder, 1939
 Kurtziella alesidota Dall, W.H., 1919: synonym of Kurtziella plumbea (Hinds, 1843)
 Kurtziella beta (Dall, 1919): synonym of Kurtzina beta (Dall, 1919)
 Kurtziella caribbeana Weisbord, N.E., 1962: synonym of Kurtziella dorvilliae (Reeve, 1845)
 Kurtziella cerinum (Kurtz & Stimpson, 1851): synonym of Kurtziella cerina (Kurtz & Stimpson, 1851)
 Kurtziella citronella (Dall, 1886): synonym of Cryoturris citronella (Dall, 1886) 
 Kurtziella crebricostata (Carpenter, 1864): synonym of Mangelia crebricostata Carpenter, 1864
 Kurtziella cruzana G.W. Nowell-Usticke, 1969: synonym of Cryoturris citronella (W.H. Dall, 1886)
 Kurtziella cyrene (Dall, 1919): synonym of Kurtzina cyrene (Dall, 1919)
 Kurtziella diomedea (Bartsch & Rehder, 1939): synonym of Rubellatoma diomedea Bartsch & Rehder, 1939
 Kurtziella longa Usticke, 1969: synonym of  Kurtziella dorvilliae (Reeve, 1845)
 Kurtziella quadrilineata (C. B. Adams, 1850): synonym of Cryoturris quadrilineata (C. B. Adams, 1850)
 Kurtziella quadrilineata longa (var.) Nowell-Usticke, G.W., 1969: synonym of Kurtziella dorvilliae (Reeve, 1845)
 Kurtziella rubella (Kurtz & Stimpson, 1851): synonym of Rubellatoma rubella (Kurtz & Stimpson, 1851)
 Kurtziella vincula Nowell-Usticke, 1969: synonym of Cryoturris vincula (Nowell-Usticke, 1969)

References

External links

 Todd, Jonathan A. "Systematic list of gastropods in the Panama Paleontology Project collections." Budd and Foster 2006 (1996)
 Worldwide Mollusc Species Data Base: Mangeliidae
  Tucker, J.K. 2004 Catalog of recent and fossil turrids (Mollusca: Gastropoda). Zootaxa 682:1-1295.

 
Gastropod genera